A structure gauge, also called the minimum clearance outline, is a diagram or physical structure that sets limits to the extent that bridges, tunnels and other infrastructure can encroach on rail vehicles. It specifies the height and width of platforms, tunnels and bridges, and the width of the doors that allow access to a warehouse from a rail siding.  Specifications may include the minimum distance from rail vehicles to railway platforms, buildings, electrical equipment boxes, signal equipment, third rails or supports for overhead lines.

A related but separate gauge is the loading gauge: a diagram or physical structure that defines the maximum height and width dimensions in railway vehicles and their loads. The difference between these two gauges is called the clearance. The specified amount of clearance makes allowance for wobbling of rail vehicles at speed; consequently, in some circumstances a train may be permitted to go past a restricted clearance at very slow speed.

Road traffic application 
The term can also be applied to the minimum size of road tunnels, the space beneath overpasses and the space within the superstructure of bridges, as well as doors into automobile repair shops, bus garages, filling stations, residential garages, multi-storey car parks, overhangs at drive-throughs and warehouses.

Crashes

Motor vehicles hit railway bridges 1789 times in 2019 in the UK, where such incidents are known as bridge strikes, with several bridges being hit over 20 times in a single year. The total cost borne by the state was around £23 million.

In May 2018, after it was struck for the 150th time by a GAZelle truck, a birthday cake was presented to the bridge. This made national news.

Similarly, an  overpass in Durham, North Carolina, USA, was frequently struck by vehicles, and made the news a number of times until it was raised in 2019.

Infrared sensors, which trigger warning signs when a high vehicle approaches, were added to an underpass in Frauenfeld, Switzerland, only after several incidents.

A similar situation exists at an underpass on Guy Street in Montreal.

Gallery

See also

 Air draft, applies to bridges across navigable waterways
 Berne gauge
 Bridge
 Clearance car
 Cut
 Disadvantages of third rail (additional infrastructure restrictions)
 Engineering tolerance
 List of bridges known for strikes
 Loading gauge
 Railway platform
 Railway platform height
 Tunnel
 Wayobjects

References

External links 
 Transport Canada, Standard Respecting Railway Clearance
 GLOSSARY OF TERMS USED IN RAILROAD HIGH AND WIDE CLEARANCES 
 Railway line clearances and car dimensions including weight ..., Volumes 87-90
 www.ipm.fraunhofer.de/railway
 Clearance Guidelines for Industrial Railways (BC)
 Transport Canada

Rail infrastructure
Road hazards